Waldemar Sobota (born 19 May 1987) is a Polish professional footballer who plays as a central midfielder and is currently a free agent.

Club career
Sobota was born in Ozimek. He joined Śląsk Wrocław on a four-year contract deal in June 2010.

He joined FC St. Pauli from Club Brugge in January 2015. In March 2018, he agreed a contract extension until 2020 with the club. Sobota left the club upon the expiration of his contract in July 2020. After FC St. Pauli had signed new manager Timo Schultz, the club announced it would not offer Sobota a new contract.

International career
On 16 December 2011, Sobota made his debut for the national team of Poland in a friendly match against Bosnia and Herzegovina, in which he immediately scored his first goal, securing his team a 1–0 victory.

Career statistics

Club

International
Scores and results list Poland's goal tally first, score column indicates score after each Sobota goal.

Honours
Śląsk Wrocław
 Ekstraklasa: 2011–12
 Polish Super Cup: 2012

References

External links
 
 

1987 births
Living people
People from Ozimek
Polish people of German descent
Silesian-German people
Sportspeople from Opole Voivodeship
Polish footballers
Association football midfielders
Poland international footballers
MKS Kluczbork players
Śląsk Wrocław players
III liga players
II liga players
I liga players
Ekstraklasa players
Club Brugge KV players
Belgian Pro League players
FC St. Pauli players
2. Bundesliga players
Polish expatriate footballers
Polish expatriate sportspeople in Belgium
Expatriate footballers in Belgium
Polish expatriate sportspeople in Germany
Expatriate footballers in Germany